Paul Sewe Omany (born 29 April 1965) is a Kenyan field hockey player. He competed in the men's tournament at the 1988 Summer Olympics.

References

External links
 

1965 births
Living people
Kenyan male field hockey players
Olympic field hockey players of Kenya
Field hockey players at the 1988 Summer Olympics
Place of birth missing (living people)